Joseph Carl Oeschger (May 24, 1892 – July 28, 1986) was an American pitcher in Major League Baseball. He played for the Philadelphia Phillies, New York Giants, Boston Braves, and Brooklyn Robins from 1914 to 1925. Oeschger is best known for holding the MLB record for the most innings pitched in a single game. In 1920, both Oeschger and Leon Cadore pitched 26 innings for their respective teams in a game that was eventually called a tie due to darkness. After his baseball career ended, Oeschger was a teacher for the San Francisco Board of Education for 27 years.

Early life 
Oeschger was born in Chicago, one of six children of immigrants from Switzerland. In 1900 his family moved to Ferndale, California, where Joe's father bought  of land and established a dairy ranch. Joe and his three brothers all attended Ferndale High School, where they played baseball. After high school, Joe attended and played baseball at Saint Mary's College of California, graduating in 1914.

Early MLB career 
Oeschger began his MLB career with the Philadelphia Phillies in the 1914 season. He won four games, while losing eight, and posting a 3.77 earned run average. He pitched in a handful of games during the 1915 and 1916 seasons before becoming a full-time starter in 1917. That season he had 15 wins against 14 losses and a 2.75 earned run average. Oeschger then led the league in losses during the 1918 season with 18 and had an earned run average of 3.03. One of the few highlights of his season was his shutout against the Brooklyn Robins on April 22. He also tied for the league lead in saves, with three. On May 27, 1919 Oeschger was traded from the Phillies to the New York Giants for Ed Sicking and George Smith. He only pitched in five games for the Giants before being included in a trade to the Braves for Art Nehf.

Longest game 

On May 1, 1920 the Braves and Robins played at Boston in front of a crowd of 2,000 spectators. Oeschger started for the Braves, and Leon Cadore started for the Robins. The game was held scoreless until the top of the fifth inning, when Ernie Krueger scored on an Ivy Olson single. In the sixth inning Walton Cruise tripled, then scored on a Tony Boeckel single. The game was eventually ruled a tie after 26 innings because of darkness. Oescheger only gave up 9 hits the entire game, while Cadore allowed 15.  Oeschger had one hit in nine trips to the plate, a double.  If they had played one more inning the pitchers would have played the equivalent of three games.

For the rest of the 1920 season Oescheger won 15 games with a 3.46 earned run average.

Later MLB career 
On September 8, 1921, Oeschger became the fourth pitcher in major league history to throw an immaculate inning, striking out all three batters on a total of nine pitches in the fourth inning of a game against the Philadelphia Phillies. He had his only 20-win season that year, which was the third-best in the National League. He also had a lack of control, leading the league in walks with 97, and hit by pitches with 10.

Oeschger then collapsed the next two seasons, having a combined total of 36 losses with only 11 wins, and an earned run average over 5.

On November 11, 1923, Oeschger and Billy Southworth were traded from Boston to the New York Giants for Dave Bancroft and Casey Stengel. Oeschger played for the Giants and Phillies in 1924, and he finished his MLB career with the Robins in 1925. For his career he had 83 wins and 116 defeats and never appeared in a World Series.

Later life
Oeschger later moved to San Francisco, where he taught physical education for the San Francisco Board of Education for 27 years. He was invited to throw out the first pitch of game one of the 1983 World Series that pitted the Philadelphia Phillies against the Baltimore Orioles. He died in Rohnert Park, California, at age 94.

See also

 List of Major League Baseball annual shutout leaders
 List of Major League Baseball annual saves leaders

References

External links

1892 births
1986 deaths
Major League Baseball pitchers
Philadelphia Phillies players
New York Giants (NL) players
Boston Braves players
Brooklyn Robins players
Providence Grays (minor league) players
Mission Bells players
Oakland Oaks (baseball) players
Mobile Bears players
Saint Mary's Gaels baseball players
Baseball players from Chicago
American people of Swiss descent